Francisco el Matemático: Clase 2017, is a Colombian television series that premiered on 13 February 2017 on RCN Televisión, and concluded on 2 June 2017. It is a sequel to the series of the same name that aired from 1999 to 2004. It stars Carlos Torres as the titular character.

The series focuses on topics such as first love, sexual orientation, parties with friends, rebellion, tattoos, alcoholism, anorexia, addiction to social networks, physical changes, and bullying.

Premise 
The series tells the story of a teacher and his students from the district school "Jimmy Carter", following the same style of the previous series Francisco el matemático. This new season will bring new themes, new stories and will also focus on the current problems of young people such as social networks, drugs, homosexuality, among others.

Cast 
 Carlos Torres as Francisco Quintana / Francisco el matemático
 Juan David Galindo as Arturo Sanabria / Coordinador Arturo Sanabria
 Danielle Arciniegas as Mónica / La Barby’s
 Victoria Ortiz as Rubí Moreno
 Katherine Escobar as Mariana Rivera
 Margarita Reyes as Gloria García
 Marcela Bustamante as Ingrid
 Edinson Gil as Fabián Castro
 Dylan Fuentes as Cristian Alfonso
 María José Vargas as Juliana Largo
 Laura Villa Pico as Luna García
 Ana María Aguilera as Johana Escobar
 Mauricio Figueroa as Ezequiel Cuervo 
 Jorge Monterrosa as Fernando (Fercho)
 Guillermo Blanco as Sebastián Samper
 Kevin Bury as Brayan Esteban Largo
 Juan Felipe Arcila as Daniel Octavio Trujillo
 Cristian David Duque as Giovanni Castro (Gigio)
 Alejandra Crispin as Lesly
 Andrés Rojas  as Juan Camilo Daza (JuanK)
 Juan Pablo Posada as Carlos Patiño (Chuly)
 Marianela Quintero as Cristina García
 Ana María Pérez as Melissa Sánchez
 María Irene Toro as Amparito
 Cristian Gómez as Luis

Guest 
 Mario Ruiz as himself
 Mike Bahía as himself
 David Escobar as himself
Luisa Fernanda W as herself

References 

2017 telenovelas
Colombian telenovelas
2017 Colombian television series debuts
RCN Televisión telenovelas
2010s Colombian television series
Spanish-language telenovelas
2017 Colombian television series endings
Television series about educators
Television shows set in Bogotá